Lee Eun-jae (born September 7, 1990), known professionally as Jaejae, is a South Korean television producer, host, and television personality. She is best known as the host for MMTG.

Filmography

Television series

Television shows

Web shows

Hosting

Awards and nominations

References

1990 births
Living people
South Korean television presenters
Ewha Womans University alumni